"Everything I Shouldn't Be Thinking About" is a song recorded by American country music duo Thompson Square. The song is the duo's sixth single release overall, and the second from their second studio album Just Feels Good. Both members of the duo wrote the song with David Lee Murphy and Brett James.

Content
The duet is an exchange between both members of the group (Kiefer and Shawna Thompson), in which both of them sing that they are trying to think about their worldly problems, but can only focus on each other at the moment.

Critical reception
Giving it 3.5 out of 5 stars, Billy Dukes of Taste of Country said that "What the song lacks in creativity, the couple more than make up for in delivery." It received 4 out of 5 stars from Bobby Peacock of Roughstock, who said that "the production is very energetic, with a heavy beat and searing guitar solos, and both members of the duo are in as fine voice as ever" but said that it was "lyrically thin".

Music video
The music video was directed by Chris Hicky and premiered in July 2013.

Chart performance
The song has sold 165,000 copies in the US as of April 2014.

Year-end charts

References

2013 singles
Thompson Square songs
BBR Music Group singles
Songs written by Brett James
Songs written by David Lee Murphy
Music videos directed by Chris Hicky
Song recordings produced by New Voice Entertainment
2013 songs